The Second Supper was a web site and newspaper published in La Crosse, Wisconsin.  The newspaper was published weekly from its headquarters in Downtown La Crosse.

Originally created as a satirical newspaper, The Second Supper has since 2007 become more focused on local interest stories.  Weekly issues include music, new films, cult classics, and book reviews, as well as Q&A's with established and up and coming musicians such as Hanson, Wes Borland, Killdozer, Julien-K, and Freezepop.  Local interest stories and editorial columns take up the main share of content, often sticking to a universal theme for the week's issue.

The Second Supper has had its share of controversy.  In 2006, the paper published a satirical piece about former United States Vice President Dick Cheney.  For the 2007 Oktoberfest issue, the paper's cover featured a gloved hand emerging from water, in reference to La Crosse's history of river drownings.

Notes

External links
The Second Supper
The Second Supper Facebook
The Second Supper Myspace
Second Supper Issue 123
Mind Inversion

La Crosse, Wisconsin
University of Wisconsin–La Crosse
College humor magazines
Student newspapers published in Wisconsin